U.S. Route 127 (US 127) in Kentucky runs  from the Tennessee state line in rural Clinton County to the Ohio state line in Cincinnati. The southern portion of the route is mostly rural, winding through various small towns along the way. It later runs through the state capital of Frankfort before continuing north, eventually passing through several Cincinnati suburbs in Northern Kentucky, joining US 42 near Warsaw and US 25 in Florence before crossing the Ohio River via the Clay Wade Bailey Bridge.

Route description
US 127 enters the state at Static on the state line separating Pickett County, Tennessee, from Clinton County, Kentucky, where it intersects Tennessee State Route 111 (SR 111, formerly SR 42) and Kentucky Route 1076 (KY 1076). It passes through Albany with a business route and bypass. It passes through Jamestown with a business route and bypass, and then through Russell Springs, where it has a junction with the Cumberland Parkway. The highway then traverses Casey, western Lincoln, and Boyle Counties, including the communities of Liberty, Hustonville, and Danville, respectively. After Danville, where it has a bypass with US 150, it goes north to Harrodsburg (Mercer County), Lawrenceburg (Anderson County), both with bypasses and business routes, and then Franklin County, the home of the state capital city of Frankfort.

After the capital, US 127 then passes through Owen and Gallatin counties, including the city of Owenton. After its junction with Interstate 71 (I-71), US 127 joins US 42 east of Warsaw. The highway then travels into Boone County, where it has a junction with I-75/I-71 before entering the city of Florence, and then enters Kenton County, and goes through the cities of Erlanger and then Covington before it (during its concurrency with US 25) leaves the state by crossing the Ohio River into downtown Cincinnati, Hamilton County, Ohio.

History 
In 1958, US 127's southern terminus was relocated from Cincinnati, Ohio to Chattanooga, Tennessee. The highway's extension into Kentucky and Tennessee resulted in the decommissioning of the following roadways:
The original KY 239 from US 42 to Glencoe,
KY 16 from Glencoe to its junction with US 227 (now KY 227), and
KY 35 from Owenton to the Tennessee state line.

Major intersections

Business and bypass routes

References

 Kentucky
Transportation in Clinton County, Kentucky
Transportation in Russell County, Kentucky
Transportation in Casey County, Kentucky
Transportation in Lincoln County, Kentucky
Transportation in Boyle County, Kentucky
Transportation in Mercer County, Kentucky
Transportation in Anderson County, Kentucky
Transportation in Franklin County, Kentucky
Transportation in Owen County, Kentucky
Transportation in Gallatin County, Kentucky
Transportation in Boone County, Kentucky
Transportation in Kenton County, Kentucky
27-1